Ahmed Al Swaileh  (born 14 May 1986) is a Saudi Arabian football player for Hajer Club. A quick and strong striker, he was the second striker of Al-Hilal behind the super star Yasser Al-Qahtani.

Al Swaileh has made several appearances for the Saudi Arabia national football team, including a 2006 FIFA World Cup qualifying match.

He also played for Saudi Arabia at the 2003 FIFA World Youth Championship in the United Arab Emirates.

References

1986 births
Living people
People from Al-Hasa
Association football forwards
Saudi Arabian footballers
Saudi Arabia youth international footballers
Saudi Arabia international footballers
Al Hilal SFC players
FC Red Bull Salzburg players
Al-Fateh SC players
Hajer FC players
Al-Qadsiah FC players
Saudi Professional League players